Valentyna Holenkova (born May 7, 1992) is a Ukrainian gymnast.  She participated in the 2008 Olympic Games in Beijing, where her best result was finishing 37th in the women's individual all-around prelims.

See also
List of Olympic female gymnasts for Ukraine

References

Ukrainian female artistic gymnasts
Olympic gymnasts of Ukraine
1992 births
Living people
Gymnasts at the 2008 Summer Olympics
Universiade medalists in gymnastics
Universiade silver medalists for Ukraine
21st-century Ukrainian women